Merck-Stadion am Böllenfalltor is a multi-use stadium in Darmstadt, Germany. It is currently used for football matches and is the home of SV Darmstadt 98 in the 2. Bundesliga. The stadium has a maximum capacity of 17,468 since its most recent renovation works.

Panorama

External links
 Groundhopping.de page

References

  

Football venues in Germany
SV Darmstadt 98
Sports venues in Hesse